The Manistee Champs were a minor league baseball team based in Manistee, Michigan. The Champs played from 1912 to 1914, after an earlier Manistee team played in 1890, followed by the 1911 Manistee "Colts." The Manistee teams played exclusively as members of the Michigan State League, winning three consecutive league titles from 1911 to 1913, leading to the "Champs" nickname. Manistee was expelled from the Michigan State League in 1914 and moved to Belding, Michigan. Mainstee hosted minor league home games at the Parkdale Grounds.

History
Organized baseball began in Manistee, Michigan as early as 1876, with the Manistee town team hosting home games at the Canfield's Ravine ballpark. Admission was free.

Minor league baseball began in Manistee, Michigan in 1890. The Manistee team became members of the six–team Independent level Michigan State League. The 1890 Michigan State League folded during the season. Manistee was in 2nd place with a 16–6 record when the league folded on June 13, 1890. The Michigan State League folded one day after the 1st place Grand Rapids Shamrocks (17–6) left to join the International League. The Manistee team was managed by John Murphy.

In 1911, minor league baseball returned to Manistee, Michigan, with the team winning a championship. The Manistee Colts returned to play as members of the reformed six–team Class D level Michigan State League. The Manistee Colts and Boyne City Boosters franchises joined four returning 1910 Western Michigan League teams, the Cadillac Chiefs, Holland Wooden Shoes, Muskegon Reds and Traverse City Resorters in beginning Michigan State League play on May 23, 1911.

The Manistee Colts ended the 1911 Michigan State League season with the league championship. With a record of 74–45, the Colts ended the season just 0.5 game ahead of the 2nd place Cadillac Chiefs and Muskegon Reds, who had identical 73–45 records. Managed by Ed R. Somerlott, Earl Zook and Connie Lewis, the Colts won the championship in the league, which did not have playoffs in 1911. Pitcher Ray Williams of Manistee led the league with 25 wins and 169 strikeouts.

In 1912, Manistee won their second consecutive Michigan State League championship. The renamed Manistee "Champs" finished in 1st place with a record of 83–35. Playing under returning manager Connie Lewis, Manistee finished 4.5 games ahead of the 2nd place Traverse City Resorters in the six–team league final standings. Pitcher Omer Benn of Manistee led the league with 22 wins.

Continuing Michigan State League play, the 1913 Manistee Champs won a third consecutive championship. With a final record of 73–47, the team placed 1st, playing again under the direction of manager Connie Lewis. Manistee finished 10.5 games ahead of the 2nd place Traverse City Resorters in the six–team league. No playoffs were held in 1913. Grover Prough of Manistee led the league with 14 home runs, while teammate John Radloff led the Michigan State with both 18 wins and 235 strikeouts.

In their final season of play, the Manistee Champs relocated during the season amidst controversy. On September 9, 1914, the Manistee franchise was expelled from the Michigan State League and the team moved to Belding, Michigan with a 56–51 record. The relocated team finished the remainder of the season playing as the Belding Champs. After a 1–13 record while based in Belding, the team placed 4th in the 1914 Michigan State League final standings. The league began the season as a six–team league. On September 1, 1914, the Boyne City Boosters and Traverse City Resorters franchises folded. The Champs ended the season with a record of 57–64 overall record, playing under manager Louis Haidt in both locations. The Manistee/Belding team finished 18.5 games behind the 1st place and champion Muskegon Speeders in the final league standings.

The Michigan State League folded after the 1914 season with the beginning of World War I. When the league resumed play in 1926, Manistee did not field a franchise. Manistee, Michigan has not hosted another minor league team.

In 1934, the Manistee "Saints" began play as a semi–professional team and have continued uninterrupted play. Today, the Manistee Saints continue play as members of the Great Lakes UBL.

The ballpark
The Manistee, Michigan minor league teams hosted minor league teams home games at the Parkdale Grounds. The ballpark was located within the Parkdale Fairgrounds, North of Manistee and Manistee Lake.

Timeline

Year-by-Year Record

Notable alumni

Henry Benn (1911–1912)
Hub Hart (1912)
Gene Layden (1914)
Frank Killen (1890)
Jack McMahon (1890)
Earl Smith (1913)
Bill Stellberger (1890)

See also
Manistee (minor league baseball) playersManistee Colts playersManistee Champs players

References

External links
Baseball Reference

Defunct minor league baseball teams
Defunct baseball teams in Michigan
Baseball teams established in 1912
Baseball teams disestablished in 1914
Michigan State League teams
Manistee County, Michigan